Wellsprings Friends School is a private non-profit alternative high school in Eugene, Oregon, United States. It was founded in 1994 by members of the Eugene Friends Meeting, a local Quaker church. It serves a maximum of 65 students each year in grades 9-12.

Academics
Wellsprings is accredited through the Northwest Association of Accredited Schools.

References

External links
 Wellsprings School Design page

High schools in Lane County, Oregon
Education in Eugene, Oregon
Alternative schools in Oregon
Educational institutions established in 1996
Schools accredited by the Northwest Accreditation Commission
Private high schools in Oregon
1996 establishments in Oregon
Quaker schools in Oregon